The Russian Orthodox Cathedral of the Dormition of the Mother of God and All Saints is the cathedral of the Russian Orthodox Diocese of Sourozh.

It holds the diocese's administrative meetings as well as weekly, seasonal and special services. Its building is the Victorian former church of a wealthy parish of its era that faces the north-east green of Ennismore Gardens, Knightsbridge, London, England.  The main (western) façade is a very close copy of that of the Basilica of San Zeno, Verona, in Verona, Italy since remodelling in 1891.

Its interior is largely unchanged from that of its Anglican forebear church built, which was built in 1848–1849. The architect was Lewis Vulliamy.

History

Anglican church
The building was erected as an Anglican Church to All Saints. Architect Lewis Vulliamy proposed to build a church in Lombard style instead of conventional Gothic style. His full vision could not be realized financially.

Consecration of the church took place in July 1849. It became a parish spanning outside much of Hyde Park: in the west Kensington Palace and about 20 houses beyond and a more populous strip to the south.  It is shown almost all as in the upper 3 of the 7 categories of wealth of Booth's poverty map at the end of the century.

In 1860, architect R. L. Roumieu completed the construction of the bell tower from the draft designs of Vulliamy, at 36.5 meters.

Since reconstruction in 1891–1892, the western façade has borne a very close resemblance to the Basilica of St Zeno of Verona.

The first interior decoration was by Thomas R. Spence. The current forms including sgraffito and stained glass windows are by Heywood Sumner.

In 1924, a house for church's priest was built on a very small square plot against the southern edge of its land: 66 Ennismore Gardens, Church House.

Transfer
In 1955, the Anglican parish was merged so that the Church of the Holy Trinity on Prince Consort Road to the west became the parish church. The church was let for the use of the Russian Orthodox faith, a trust having been set up in 1944. The building was consecrated as an Orthodox Church in December 1956 in honour of the Dormition of the Mother of God.

Russian Orthodox church
In 1978 it was purchased by the Sourozh diocese, without funds from the Moscow Patriarchate. Over time, including the tenure of Metropolitan Anthony ( 2003), the parish gained multinational congregants.

In 2006, a substantial part of the clergy and laity, headed by Bishop Basil (Osborne), Administrator of the Diocese, decided to leave the Moscow Patriarchate. In June 2007 the Parish Council of the Cathedral voted to place the Cathedral under the Episcopal Vicariate headed by Bishop Basil.  This was challenged by the Moscow Patriarchate and in 2009 the High Court decided, on the wording of the 1944 Trust Deed of the Cathedral, that it should remain with the adherents of the Moscow Patriarchate.

Priors
 Metropolitan Anthony (Bloom) (1956–2002)
 Archpriest John Lee (2002–2003)
 Bishop Basil (Osborne) (2003–2006)
 Archbishop Innocent (Vasiliev) (2006–2007)
 Archbishop Elisey (Ganaba) (2007-2017)

Gallery

References

External links

 

Grade II* listed churches in the City of Westminster
Eastern Orthodox church buildings in the United Kingdom
Russian Orthodox cathedrals in Europe
Churches completed in 1849
19th-century Church of England church buildings
Russian diaspora in the United Kingdom
Russian Orthodox Church Outside of Russia
1849 establishments in England
Cathedrals in London
Knightsbridge
Grade II* listed cathedrals
Former Church of England church buildings